Saman (also Romanized as Sāmān; also known as  Sāmān Qal‘eh-ye Pā’īn) is a village in Kuhpayeh Rural District, Nowbaran District, Saveh County, Markazi Province, Iran. At the 2006 census, its population was 378, in 166 families.

The 14th-century author Hamdallah Mustawfi described Saman as "a large village in the district of the Two Kharraqans", lying on a stream that flowed down from a mountain also called Saman before joining the Muzdaqan stream and flowing towards Saveh. The crops grown at Saman, Mustawfi reported, were grain, grapes, and "some little fruit".

References 

Populated places in Saveh County